Raymond Martin (born January 2, 1994, in Jersey City, New Jersey) is an American Paralympic athlete of Filipino descent. He won seven Paralympic gold medals and nine World gold medals in the T52 wheelchair racing category.

References

External links 
 
 
 

1992 births
Living people
American male track and field athletes
Paralympic gold medalists for the United States
Paralympic medalists in athletics (track and field)
Paralympic track and field athletes of the United States
Athletes (track and field) at the 2012 Summer Paralympics
Athletes (track and field) at the 2016 Summer Paralympics
Athletes (track and field) at the 2020 Summer Paralympics
Medalists at the 2012 Summer Paralympics
Medalists at the 2016 Summer Paralympics
Medalists at the 2020 Summer Paralympics
World Para Athletics Championships winners
Illinois Fighting Illini Paralympic athletes
World record holders in Paralympic athletics
People from Jersey City, New Jersey
American people of Filipino descent